Zaccaria,  (later briefly reorganized under Mr. Game before ending production) was an Italian company of pinball and arcade machines that existed in Bologna from 1974 until  1990. The factory was sold to tecnoplay.

History
The company was founded as a manufactory for pinball arcade games in Bologna by the three brothers Marino, Franco and Natale Zaccaria. The logo consists of their initials.  Zaccaria was led by Marino Zaccaria, a former manager of a bar near Bologna.

At their best time, Zaccaria was the third largest company of pinball machines in the world after Bally and Williams. The company also entered into the video arcade game sector in the late 1970s. Therefore, they licensed games and developed some games with their own designs.

There are at least 47 different Zaccaria pinball machines known to exist although some are just variations of the same game.

Zaccaria pinball machines

 Tropical (1974)
 Cine Star (1974)
 Top Hand (1974)
 Granada (1974)
 Red Show (1975)
 Ten Up (1975)
 Lucky Fruit (1975)
 Ten Stars (1976)
 Moon Flight (1976)
 Wood's Queen (1976)
 Aerobatics (1977)
 Circus (1977)
 Combat (1977)
 Nautilus (1977)
 Universe (1977)
 Supersonic (1977)
 Queen's Castle (1978)
 Winter Sports (1978)
 House of Diamonds (1978)
 Strike (1978)
 Future World (1978)
 Ski Jump (1978)
 Shooting the Rapids (1979)
 Hot Wheels (1979)
 Space City (1979)
 Fire Mountain (1980)
 Star God (1980)
 Space Shuttle (1980)
 Earth Wind Fire (1981)
 Locomotion (1981)
 Soccer Kings (1982, released in the US by Bhuzac)
 Pinball Champ '82 (1982)
 Pinball Champ (1983, released in the US by Bhuzac)
 Time Machine (1983)
 Farfalla (1983, released in the US by Bhuzac)
 Devil Riders (1984, released in the US by Bhuzac)
 Magic Castle (1984, released in the US by Bhuzac)
 Robot (1985)
 Clown (1985)
 Pool Champion (1985)
 Mystic Star (1986)
 Blackbelt (1986)
 Mexico ’86 (1986)
 Zankor (1986)
 Spooky (1987)
 Star's Phoenix (1987)
 New Star's Phoenix (1987)

Zaccaria arcade machines

 TV-Joker (1974), PONG clone
 Circus (1977), licensed Exidy Circus
 The Invaders (1978), Space Invaders clone
 Astro Wars (1979), port of Data East Astro Fighter
 Dodgem (1979), port of Sega Head On
 Galaxia (1979), port of Namco Galaxian
 Quasar (1980), Zaccaria Original, distributed in US by US Billiards
 Moon Crest (1980), Quasar machine with a space fortress side art
 Firebird  (1980), licensed Amstar Phoenix
 Space Pirate  (1980), copy of Cinematronics' Rip-Off
 Puckman (1980), copy of Namco Pac-Man
 Scramble (1980), licensed Konami Scramble
 Buck Rogers (1981), licensed Sega Buck Rogers
 Vanguard (1981), licensed SNK Vanguard
 Super Cobra (1981), licensed Konami Super Cobra
 Frogger (1981), licensed Konami Frogger
 Crazy Kong (1981), licensed Falcon Crazy Kong
 Pac and Paint (1981), port of Kural Crush Roller
 Zaxxon (1981), port of Sega Zaxxon
 Hustler (1981), licensed Video Hustler
 Comidar (1981), licensed Konami Amidar
 Fitter (1981), licensed Round Up
 Laser Battle (1981), Zaccaria Original, distributed in US by Midway by the title Lazarian
 Scorpion (1982), ?
 Sea Battle (1982), ?
 Dribbling (1982), port of Dribbling by Model Racing
 Jump Bug (1982), port Rock-Ola Jump Bug
 Fantasy (1982), port Rock-Ola Fantasy
 Cat and Mouse (1982), Zaccaria Original
 Eyes (1982), licensed Techstar Eyes
 Mr. Do! (1982), licensed Universal Mr. Do!
 Eggor (1983), Telko Eggor
 Money Money (1983, released in the US by Bhuzac), Zaccaria Original
 Hyper Sports (1983), licensed Konami Hyper Sports
 Hyper Olympics (1983), licensed Konami Hyper Olympics
 Shooting Gallery (1984, released in the US by Bhuzac), developed by Seatongrove
 Jack Rabbit (1984, released in the US by Bhuzac), Zaccaria Original

Digital recreations

Magic Pixel Kft. released Zaccaria Pinball for Android and iOS as well as Windows on Steam that consists of digital recreations of classic Zaccaria pinball machines.  Versions for OS X as well as Linux were released on August 31, 2017. In July 2018, it was released for Nintendo Switch, April 2019 for Xbox One, and August 2020 for PlayStation 4.

Digital pinball machines
There are 42 digital tables released.

 
 Aerobatics
 Blackbelt
 Cine Star
 Circus
 Clown
 Combat
 Devil Riders
 Earth Wind Fire
 Farfalla
 Fire Mountain
 Future World
 Granada
 Hot Wheels
 House of Diamonds
 Locomotion
 Lucky Fruit
 Magic Castle
 Mexico ’86
 Moon Flight
 Mystic Star
 Nautilus
 Pinball Champ 82
 Pinball Champ 83
 Pool Champion
 Postal Redux
 Red Show
 Robot
 Shooting the Rapids
 Soccer Kings
 Space Shuttle
 Spooky
 Star God
 Star's Phoenix
 Strike
 Supersonic
 Time Machine
 Top Hand
 Tropical
 Universe
 Winter Sports
 Wood's Queen 
 Zankor

Company Mr. Game

Zaccaria was briefly reorganized under the label Mr. Game before ending production. The company Mr. Game produced pinball machines from 1988 until 1990. Under the Mr. Game label, the company introduced a radical redesign of the traditional pinball cabinet. The commonly known rectangular cabinet containing the 'playfield' was updated into a more modern look with a different shaped box, and trigger buttons for flipper control. The legs were also more angular in support compared to the mostly vertical legs used by other manufacturers. Additionally, the 'backbox' eliminated the traditional numeric or alpha-numeric score and status displays in favor of a small color TV screen, sometimes containing video game elements.

Mr. Game pinball machines
 Dakar (1988)	 
 Fast Track	 
 Mac Attack (1989)
 Motor Show (1989, released in the US by United Artists Theatre Amusements)
 Sofficini Dakar
 World Cup '90 (1990)

Successor tecnoplay

After bankruptcy, the factory in Bologna of Zaccaria was sold to tecnoplay in San Marino, that produced pinball machines from 1987 - 1989 and is still in business as an importer, reseller and maintainer of pinball machines, spare parts, arcade and vending machines and other amusement games. Tecnoplay is managed by Mauro Zaccaria, the son of Marino Zaccaria, one of the founders of the company Zaccaria.

Tecnoplay pinball machines
 Devil King (1987)
 Scramble (1987)
 X-Force (1987)
 Space Team (1989)
 Hi-Ball (1989)

See also
 Playmatic, a former Spanish company of pinball machines
 Inder, another former Spanish company of pinball and arcade machines
 Taito of Brazil, a former Brazilian company of pinball and arcade machines
 Maresa, a former Spanish company of pinball machines
 Sega, S.A. SONIC, a former Spanish company of pinball and arcade machines

References

Further reading
 Fabio Rossi. Dizionario dei Videogame. Milano, Garzanti, 1993. 
 Tristan Donovan. Replay: The History of Video Games. Yellow Ant, 2010.

External links

 Zaccaria at The Internet Pinball database
 Zaccaria Forum and Database
 List of Zaccaria pinball machines
 Zaccaria arcade machines
 Zaccaria arcade collection and book of production
 Zaccaria company information
 Zaccaria at The International Arcade Museum
 
 Official Zaccaria Pinball support site
 Zaccaria parts & diagnostic tools
 'Arcade Raid! Euro Zaccaria Rescue' retrospective on discovering disused Zaccaria machines (2017-07-28, Tony. 8 arcade coin-ops, 2 pinball machines & 2 cocktail tables.)
 Mr. Game at The Internet Pinball database
 Mr. Game at The International Arcade Museum
 Tecnoplay at The Internet Pinball database
 Tecnoplay at The International Arcade Museum
 Zaccaria Pinball Unofficial "Hall of Wizards" Steam

Android (operating system) games
Entertainment companies of Italy
IOS games
Defunct manufacturing companies of Italy
Manufacturing companies based in Bologna
Pinball manufacturers
Pinball video games
PlayStation 4 games
Windows games
Linux games